Honoré-Mercier (formerly Anjou—Rivière-des-Prairies) is a federal electoral district in Quebec, Canada, that has been represented in the House of Commons of Canada since 1988.

Geography
The district includes the entire Borough of Anjou, the eastern part of the Borough of Rivière-des-Prairies–Pointe-aux-Trembles, and the northern part of the Borough of Mercier—Hochelaga-Maisonneuve.

The neighbouring ridings are Hochelaga, Saint-Léonard—Saint-Michel, Bourassa, Alfred-Pellan, Montcalm, and La Pointe-de-l'Île (electoral district).

Political geography
While the other eastern Montreal ridings have traditionally been Bloc Québécois strongholds, Honoré-Mercier is politically a very divided riding. Rivière-des-Prairies is very Liberal leaning, while Anjou supports the Bloc for the most part, but has some Liberal pockets.

However, the NDP's "orange wave" in the 2011 election overwhelmed previous distinctions, with the New Democrats winning 149 of 218 polling divisions in the district.

Demographics
According to the Canada 2016 Census

 Languages: (2016) 51.1% French, 16.2% Italian, 8.1% English, 6.2% Creole, 4.9% Spanish, 4.1% Arabic, 1.4% Portuguese, 1.2% Romanian, 1.0% Kabyle, 0.9% Vietnamese, 0.6% Khmer

History
The district was created in 1987 under the name Anjou—Rivière-des-Prairies from parts of Gamelin, Montreal—Mercier and Saint-Léonard—Anjou ridings.

It consisted of:
 the Borough of Anjou;
 the parts of the Town of Montréal bounded by:
  Sherbrooke Street East, Duquesne Street, Rosemont Boulevard and Lacordaire Boulevard; and
 Autoroute de la Rive Nord, Henri-Bourassa Boulevard East; the limits of the towns of Montréal-Est, Anjou and Montréal-Nord to the point of commencement.

In 2003, its name was changed to Honoré-Mercier and its boundaries were adjusted slightly such that 95.5% of the riding came from the original Anjou—Rivière-des-Prairies, while 4.5% came from Hochelaga—Maisonneuve.

This riding lost territory to La Pointe-de-l'Île and Hochelaga, and gained territory from Bourassa during the 2012 electoral redistribution.

Member of Parliament

This riding has elected the following Members of Parliament:

Election results

Honoré-Mercier, 2003–present

Anjou—Rivière-des-Prairies, 1987–2003

See also
 List of Canadian federal electoral districts
 Past Canadian electoral districts

References

Campaign expense data from Elections Canada
Honoré-Mercier riding history from the Library of Parliament 
Anjou—Rivière-des-Prairies riding history from the Library of Parliament

Notes

Federal electoral districts of Montreal
Anjou, Quebec
Rivière-des-Prairies–Pointe-aux-Trembles
Mercier–Hochelaga-Maisonneuve